Syamsir Alam (born 6 July 1992 in Agam, Indonesia) is an Indonesian former footballer who plays as a forward.

Club career 
Born in Agam, Alam played youth football for Peñarol, Heerenveen and Vitesse Arnhem. After playing for Visé, he signed on loan for D.C. United. 
In 2014, he signed with Sriwijaya FC.

On December 27, 2014, he signed with Pelita Bandung Raya.

in early 2021, Alam returned to his career in football. 
he had decided to retire early at the age of 23 after the last time he defended the club Persiba Balikpapan. Alam then moved into the world of entertainment by hosting a TV show. But he expressed interest in returning to playing football.
there are at least two figures who managed to persuade him to return to the world of football. namely Raffi Ahmad and Hamka Hamzah. they then convinced him to come back and try again his career in the world of football.

In April 23, 2021, Syamsir Alam signed a contract with Indonesian Liga 2 club RANS Cilegon.

International career 
He represented Indonesia on several occasions from the U-11 through the U-23.

Career statistics

Club

International goals

Honours

Club
RANS Cilegon
 Liga 2 runner-up: 2021

International
Indonesia U-23
Islamic Solidarity Games  Silver medal: 2013

References

External links 
 
 Syamsir Alam at Liga Indonesia

1992 births
Living people
People from Agam Regency
Indonesian footballers
Association football forwards
SC Heerenveen players
SBV Vitesse players
C.S. Visé players
D.C. United players
Sriwijaya F.C. players
Pelita Bandung Raya players
Persiba Balikpapan players
RANS Nusantara F.C. players
Liga 1 (Indonesia) players
Liga 2 (Indonesia) players
Indonesian expatriate footballers
Indonesian expatriate sportspeople in Uruguay
Expatriate footballers in Uruguay
Indonesian expatriate sportspeople in the Netherlands
Expatriate footballers in the Netherlands
Indonesian expatriate sportspeople in Belgium
Expatriate footballers in Belgium
Indonesian expatriate sportspeople in the United States
Expatriate soccer players in the United States
Sportspeople from West Sumatra